The 2004–05 FA Trophy was the thirty-fifth season of the FA Trophy, the Football Association's cup competition for teams at levels 5–8 of the English football league system.

Preliminary round

Ties

† – After extra time

Replays

† – After extra time

First round
Teams from Conference North and Conference South entered in this round

Ties

Replays

† – After extra time

Second round

Ties

Replays

† – After extra time

Third round
Hednesford Town as title holders and teams from Conference National entered in this round.

Ties

Replays

† – After extra time

Fourth round

Ties

Replays

Fifth round

Ties

Replays

Sixth round

Ties

Replays

† After Extra Time

Semi-finals

First leg

Second leg

Grays Athletic win 7–0 on aggregate

Hucknall Town win 5–3 on aggregate

Final

References

 Football Club History Database: FA Trophy 2004-05

Specific

2004–05 domestic association football cups
League
2004-05